Valaida Snow (June 2, 1904 – May 30, 1956) was an American jazz musician and entertainer who performed internationally. She was also known as "Little Louis" and "Queen of the Trumpet," a nickname given to her by W. C. Handy.

Biography

Snow was born in Chattanooga, Tennessee. Her mother, Etta, was a Howard University-educated music teacher and her father, John, was a minister who was the leader of the Pickaninny Troubadours, a group mainly consisting of child performers. Raised on the road in a show-business family, where starting from the age of five, she began performing with her father's group. By the time she was 15, she learned to play cello, bass, banjo, violin, mandolin, harp, accordion, clarinet, trumpet, and saxophone. She also sang and danced.

Her solo career began when she joined a popular revue called Holiday in Dixieland, after exiting an abusive marriage. She then held a residency at a Harlem cabaret, which helped lead her to be cast along Josephine Baker in the musical In Bamville, a follow-up to the enduring hit musical Shuffle Along. While the musical was itself not a hit, Baker and Snow both received positive reviews.

After focusing on the trumpet, Snow quickly became so famous at the instrument that she was nicknamed "Little Louis" after Louis Armstrong, who called her the world's second best jazz trumpet player, besides himself. W. C. Handy, who is known as the Father of the Blues, gave her the nickname "Queen of the Trumpet." Contemporary critics Krin Gabbard and Will Friedwald have commented on her approach to playing like Armstrong. Gabbard said she developed a "distinctly Armstrongian style" and Friedwald said she "mimicked" Armstrong. In a 1928 performance in Chicago at the Sunset Café, Snow played the trumpet, sang. Then seven pairs of shoes were placed in a row at the front of the stage, and she danced in each pair for one chorus. The dances and shoes to match were: soft-shoe, adagio shoes, tap shoes, Dutch clogs, Chinese straw sandals, Turkish slippers, and the last pair, Russian boots. "When Louis Armstrong saw the show one night, he continued clapping after others had stopped and remarked, 'Boy I never saw anything that great'." Despite her talent, she had fewer opportunities to hold residencies as a bandleader at clubs in New York or Chicago, like many of her male peers. Instead, she predominantly toured, playing concerts throughout the US, Europe, and China. In 1926, she toured London and Paris with Lew Leslie's Blackbirds revue and then from 1926 to 1929, she toured with Jack Carter's Serenaders in Shanghai, Singapore, Calcutta, and Jakarta.

Her most successful period was in the 1930s when she became the toast of London and Paris. Around this time she recorded her hit song "High Hat, Trumpet, and Rhythm". She performed in the Ethel Waters show Rhapsody in Black, in New York. In the mid-1930s, Snow made films with her husband, Ananias Berry, of the Berry Brothers dancing troupe. After playing the Apollo Theater in New York City, she revisited Europe and the Far East for more shows and films. She was imprisoned in a Copenhagen jail during WWII when Nazi soldiers took over Denmark, where she was touring.

According to a jazz radio show that aired on October 28, 2017, Snow said she was arrested in Europe, apparently going to jail for theft and illegal drugs. While later touring Denmark in 1941, she said she was arrested by Nazis and most likely kept at Vestre Fængsel, a Danish prison in Copenhagen that was run by the Nazis, before being released on a prisoner exchange in May 1942. It was rumored that her friendship with a Belgian police official helped her to board a ship carrying foreign diplomats. According to jazz historian Scott Yanow, "she never emotionally recovered from the experience". She married Earl Edwards. In the 1950s, she was unable to regain her former success.

Valaida Snow died aged 51 of a brain hemorrhage on May 30, 1956, in New York City, backstage during a performance at the Palace Theater.

Legacy 
Many recordings of Snow performances still exist, including audio recordings and audiovisual recordings of her on stage or in films. According to musicology professor Tammy L. Kernodle, "The unfortunate thing about her legacy is that she wasn't recorded as much as many of her peers, but she was a greatly respected musician on the vaudeville circuit, and even amongst male jazz musicians themselves." This quote was from a phone interview by Giovanni Russonello, who on February 22, 2020, published her belated obituary in The New York Times, as part of the "Overlooked No More" series. There are no commercial recordings of Snow as trumpeter made in the United States, all were recorded in Europe. Before her obituary was published, The New York Times wrote about her only once in a paragraph-long review about a 1949 Song Recital at New York's Town Hall.

Dr. Kernodle also said that Snow's legacy is important as she helped "shift the context of jazz away from the early Dixieland style" and "she [was] important in terms of helping us gain an understanding of the spread of jazz to Europe, particularly after World War I."

Performances 
 March 11, 1933; Earl Hines and Snow performed in Madrid ballroom in Harrisburg, PA.
September 23, 1945; First Cavalcade of Jazz concert in Los Angeles at Wrigley Field produced by Leon Hefflin Sr. along with Count Basie, The Honeydrippers, The Peters Sisters, Slim and Bam and Joe Turner.

In literature
Earl Hines' oral autobiography, The World of Earl Hines (with Stanley Dance) includes several vignettes of Snow by her intimate friend.

Valaida Snow appears as a fictional character who threw herself on top of the protagonist when he was a child to shield him from a beating at the hands of the Nazis in a concentration camp. Snow is depicted as a strong, generous woman who proudly recalls that "They beat me, and fucked me in every hole I had. I was their whore. Their maid. A stool they stood on when they wanted to reach a little higher. But I never sang in their cage, Bobby. Not one note" (p. 28).

A novel based on Valaida Snow's life story.

Biography. Both the Allen and Miller books contradict the assertion that Snow was held by the Nazis and instead place her in Danish custody at a Copenhagen prison.

Inspired by Valaida's life, but it is more fictitious than strictly biographical.
 Valaida Snow, by Emmanuel Reuzé and Maël Rannou, comic strip, BDMusic, Paris, coll. " BDJazz ", 2012.

Family 
According to an article posted in the Pittsburgh Courier in 1933, Snow was arrested and later acquitted of bigamy after eloping with her fiancé Ananias John W. Berry, Jr. Snow had 3 sisters Lavaida Snow, Alvaida Snow, and Hattie Snow all of who were professional singers. She also had a brother named Arthur Bush.

Discography
 1940–1953 (Classics)
 Queen of Trumpet and Song (DRG, 1999)

References

1904 births
1956 deaths
American jazz trumpeters
American women jazz musicians
Chess Records artists
20th-century African-American women singers
20th-century American singers
20th-century trumpeters
20th-century American women singers
The Washboard Rhythm Kings members
Women trumpeters
African-American women musicians